The 2016–17 South Alabama Jaguars women's basketball team represented the University of South Alabama during the 2016–17 NCAA Division I women's basketball season. The Jaguars, led by fourth year head coach Terry Fowler, played their home games at the Mitchell Center as members of the Sun Belt Conference. They finished the season 11–20, 5–13 in Sun Belt play to finish in tenth place. They advanced to the quarterfinals of the Sun Belt women's tournament where they lost to Texas–Arlington.

Roster

Schedule

|-
!colspan=9 style="background:#000066; color:#ff0000;"| Exhibition

|-
!colspan=9 style="background:#000066; color:#ff0000;"| Non-conference regular season

|-
!colspan=9 style="background:#000066; color:#ff0000;"| Sun Belt regular season

|-
!colspan=9 style="background:#000066; color:#ff0000;"| Sun Belt Women's Tournament

See also
 2016–17 South Alabama Jaguars men's basketball team

References

External links

South Alabama Jaguars women's basketball seasons
South Alabama